Hymenolobium is a genus of flowering plants in the legume family, Fabaceae. It belongs to the subfamily Faboideae. It was formerly assigned to the tribe Dalbergieae, but recent molecular phylogenetic evidence has placed it in a unique clade named the Andira clade.

References

Faboideae
Fabaceae genera